Dorcadion tschitscherini is a species of beetle in the family Cerambycidae. It was described by Jakovlev in 1900. It is known from Kazakhstan.

See also 
 Dorcadion

References

tschitscherini
Beetles described in 1900